is a Japanese girl idol group managed by Stardust Promotion. It was formed in 2015 with five members from 3B Junior (out of 26 in total): Ami Uchiyama, Luna Naitō, Ruka Shiina, Chiho Takai, and Misato Hirase.

The name of the group implies their intention to "rock Japan" (to shake it, impress, get it going). 
The group was dissolved on April 29, 2019, but will have one more performance during the "EVIL A LIVE 2019" festival.

The 3 remaining members came back with the new unit B.O.L.T on April 15, 2019

Members

Former Members

Timeline

Discography

Singles

Albums

Videography

Music videos

Video albums

References

External links 
 Wikimedia Commons has media related to: ROCK A JAPONICA
Official website
 Official page at Evil Line Records
 Rock A Japonica official channel on YouTube

Japanese idol groups
Japanese girl groups
Japanese pop music groups
Child musical groups
Japanese-language singers
Vocal quintets
Musical groups established in 2015
2015 establishments in Japan
Stardust Promotion artists
Musical groups from Tokyo